Stephen J. Smartt  (born 9 November 1968) is an astrophysicist from Northern Ireland who specialises in stellar evolution, supernovae and time domain sky surveys. He is credited with the discovery of stars that explode as supernovae, measuring their mass, luminosity and the chemical elements synthesized. Smartt is a Professor of Astrophysics at the School of Mathematics and Physics at Queen's University Belfast. He is a patron of Northern Ireland Humanists.

Education 
Born and raised in Belfast, Smartt was educated at Belfast Royal Academy and studied physics and applied mathematics at Queen’s University Belfast. He was awarded a PhD in astrophysics in 1996.

Career 
He worked at the Isaac Newton Group of telescopes and held a fellowship at the University of Cambridge. Smartt returned to Belfast in 2004 and established a group working on stellar evolution, supernovae and time domain sky surveys.

Honours and awards 
Smartt was appointed Commander of the Order of the British Empire (CBE) in the 2022 Birthday Honours for services to science.

 Member of the Royal Irish Academy
 Fellow of the Royal Society, 2020 
 Philip Leverhulme Prize, 2005

References

External links
 

1968 births
Living people
Scientists from Belfast
Alumni of Queen's University Belfast
Academics of Queen's University Belfast
British astrophysicists
Fellows of the Royal Society
Members of the Royal Irish Academy
Commanders of the Order of the British Empire